Terence Vaughan  (26 May 1915 – 26 April 1996) was a notable New Zealand pianist, wartime entertainment director, conductor, composer and performing arts administrator. He was born in Whangarei, Northland, New Zealand in 1915.

References

1915 births
1996 deaths
New Zealand pianists
New Zealand conductors (music)
Male conductors (music)
New Zealand composers
Male composers
People from Whangārei
New Zealand Officers of the Order of the British Empire
20th-century conductors (music)
20th-century pianists
20th-century composers
Male pianists
20th-century male musicians